Dmitry Aleksandrovich Bogayev (born 24 January 1994) is a Russian football player. He plays as a right-back or right midfielder.

Club career
He made his professional debut in the Russian Professional Football League for FC Zenit-2 Saint Petersburg on 15 July 2013 in a game against FC Tosno.

He made his debut for the main squad of FC Zenit Saint Petersburg on 9 December 2015 in the 2015–16 UEFA Champions League group stage game against K.A.A. Gent.

He made his Russian Premier League debut for Zenit on 28 April 2016 in a game against FC Kuban Krasnodar.

He left Zenit on 5 July 2016.

On 15 June 2017, after one season with FC Tosno, he returned to Zenit, signing a 3-year contract.

On 6 February 2018, he joined FC SKA-Khabarovsk on loan until the end of the 2017–18 season.

Career statistics

Club

References

External links
 

1994 births
People from Akhtubinsky District
Living people
Russian footballers
Association football defenders
Association football midfielders
Association football forwards
FC Zenit Saint Petersburg players
Russian Premier League players
Russia under-21 international footballers
Russian expatriate footballers
Expatriate footballers in Lithuania
FC Tosno players
FC SKA-Khabarovsk players
FC Zenit-2 Saint Petersburg players
Sportspeople from Astrakhan Oblast